Maciej Biega (born 7 February 1989) is a Polish speed skater. He was born in Sanok. He competed at the 2010 Winter Olympics in Vancouver, in men's 500 metres.

References

External links 
 

1989 births
Living people
Polish male speed skaters
People from Sanok
Speed skaters at the 2010 Winter Olympics
Olympic speed skaters of Poland